Martin Joseph Donald (born February 8, 1959) is an American lawyer and a judge of the Wisconsin Court of Appeals in the Milwaukee-based District I. Donald was appointed to the court in September 2019 by Wisconsin Governor Tony Evers. Prior to his appointment to the Court of Appeals, Donald served 13 years as a Wisconsin Circuit Court judge in Milwaukee County.

Life and career 
Donald was raised in Milwaukee and Shorewood. His mother worked as a housekeeper for Richard D. Cudahy, a judge of the United States Court of Appeals for the Seventh Circuit. Their families were close, and Judge Cudahy served as a mentor to Judge Donald in his youth. Donald graduated from Marquette University in 1982 and Marquette University Law School in 1988. He subsequently served from 1988 to 1989 as a law clerk for the Wisconsin Circuit Court in Milwaukee County. From 1989 to 1996, Donald was an assistant city attorney in the Milwaukee City Attorney's Office.

In 1996, Donald was appointed by Governor Tommy Thompson, a Republican, to a vacant seat on the Milwaukee County Circuit Court. His oath was administered by his mentor, Judge Cudahy. Donald was elected to a six-year term on the court in 1997 and reelected in 2003, 2009, and 2015, without opposition.  Judge Donald was instrumental in establishing the Milwaukee County Drug Treatment Court in 2009 and served as its first judge.  The Drug Treatment Court was designed to use a system of rewards and penalties to redirect more people from jail toward treatment and recovery.

From 2015 to 2019, Donald served as a deputy chief judge of the court under chief judge Maxine Aldridge White.

In 2016, Donald sought election to the Wisconsin Supreme Court but placed third in the February primary, behind incumbent Justice Rebecca Bradley and Wisconsin Court of Appeals Judge JoAnne Kloppenburg.  Judge Donald was endorsed in this race by former United States Senator Herb Kohl.

On September 4, 2019, Donald was appointed by Democratic Governor Tony Evers to a vacant Court of Appeals judgeship in Milwaukee. Donald succeeded the retiring Judge Kitty K. Brennan.

Electoral history

Wisconsin Circuit Court (1997, 2003, 2009, 2015)

| colspan="6" style="text-align:center;background-color: #e9e9e9;"| General Election, April 1, 1997

| colspan="6" style="text-align:center;background-color: #e9e9e9;"| General Election, April 1, 2003

| colspan="6" style="text-align:center;background-color: #e9e9e9;"| General Election, April 7, 2009

| colspan="6" style="text-align:center;background-color: #e9e9e9;"| General Election, April 7, 2015

Wisconsin Supreme Court (2016)

| colspan="6" style="text-align:center;background-color: #e9e9e9;"| Primary Election, February 16, 2016

| colspan="6" style="text-align:center;background-color: #e9e9e9;"| General Election, April 5, 2016

References

External links 
 Judge M. Joseph Donald at Wisconsin Court System
 Martin Joseph Donald at Ballotpedia
 Milwaukee County Drug Treatment Court

1959 births
Living people
Lawyers from Milwaukee
Wisconsin lawyers
People from Shorewood, Wisconsin
Marquette University alumni
Marquette University Law School alumni
Wisconsin Court of Appeals judges
Wisconsin state court judges
African-American judges
20th-century American judges
21st-century American judges
20th-century African-American people
21st-century African-American people